Hild Sofie Tafjord (born 4 January 1974) is a Norwegian musician (French horn), the daughter of jazz tuba player Stein Erik Tafjord and niece to the French horn player Runar Tafjord, known from several recordings and bands, especially in experimental electronica genera.

Career 
Born in Langevåg, Norway, Tafjord first studied at the Toneheim folkehøgskole together with Maja Ratkje among others, and then the first exam in the French horn from Norwegian Academy of Music (2001).
Together with Maria Ratkje, she played in the quartet SPUNK including Lene Grenager and Kristin Andersen (from 1995), the duo Fe-mail (from 2000), and the trio Agrare (with the dancer Lotta Melin). In Slinger she played with Lene Grenager and Lisa Dillan, and in the "Kvartett Lemur" she played with Lene Grenager,  Michael Francis Duch and Bjørnar Habbestad. She often plays in duo with the saxophonist Håkon Kornstad and has collaborated with Zeena Parkins, Fred Frith, Ikue Mori and Matmos. Moreover, she has played within 'Crimetime Orchestra', 'No Spaghetti Edition' and 'Norwegian Noise Orchestra'.

Tafjord's cooperation with Kjetil Manheim from Mayhem and Øyvind Berg, is worth mentioning. Her solo album was released in collaboration with Lasse Marhaug.

Discography 
2007: KAMA (Pica Disk)
2014: Breathing (+3dB)

Collaborations 
With «Rotoscope» including Andreas Mjøs, Jørgen Træen, Knut Aalefjær, Rune Brøndbo, Lars Horntveth, Rob Waring & Christine Sandtorv
2001: Great Curves (Jester Records), feat. Hild Sofie Tafjord & Marius Reksjø

With Fe-mail and Carlos Giffoni
2006: Northern Stains (Important Records)

References

External links 
Hild Sofie Tafjord on Myspace

Norwegian jazz composers
Musicians from Langevåg
1974 births
Living people
Women in electronic music
Trondheim Jazz Orchestra members
Norwegian jazz horn players
Women horn players
20th-century Norwegian musicians
20th-century Norwegian women musicians
21st-century Norwegian musicians
21st-century Norwegian women musicians